The 2012 Under 21 Men's Australian Hockey Championships was a men's field hockey tournament. The competition was held in the Tasmanian city of Hobart.

Queensland won the gold medal after defeating Western Australia 3–0 in the final. Following a 5–5 draw, New South Wales won the bronze medal with a higher percentage of games won, finishing ahead of Tasmania.

Competition format
The tournament was played in a single round-robin format, with each team facing each other once. Final placings after the pool matches determined playoff positions. 

The bottom four teams moved to the classification round. Teams played in crossover matches, with the losing teams playing off for seventh place, and the winners for fifth. Meanwhile, the top four teams contested the medal round, with teams contesting in semi-finals. The winners played in the gold medal match, while the losers played off for bronze.

Teams

  ACT
  SA

  NSW
  TAS 

  NT
  VIC 

  QLD
  WA

Results
All times are local (AEST).

Preliminary round

Fixtures

Classification round

Fifth to eighth place classification

Crossover

Seventh and eighth place

Fifth and sixth place

First to fourth place classification

Semi-finals

Third and fourth place

Final

Statistics

Final standings

Goalscorers

References

External links

2012
2012 in Australian field hockey
Sport in Hobart